Neeme Ruus (11 December 1911, in Vologda Governorate – 2 June 1942, in Tallinn) was an Estonian politician, communist activist and Esperantist. He was a member of VI Riigikogu (its Chamber of Deputies). On 21 June 1940, Ruus was appointed Minister of Social Affairs of the cabinet of Johannes Vares.

Ruus was arrested by German authorities in the village Hirvli and executed following the German occupation of Estonia during World War II. His daughter is Ingrid Rüütel.

References

1911 births
1942 deaths
Estonian Esperantists
Communist Party of Estonia politicians
Members of the Riigivolikogu
Government ministers of Estonia
Estonian people executed by Nazi Germany